Lucerne Street Doggz were a street gang in the Lucerne Street area of Mattapan neighborhood in Boston. In 2006 Lucerne Street Gang was involved in 37 shootings in Boston counting for 10% of all shootings that year.

See also 
Columbia Point Dawgs

References  

Organizations established in 2003
2003 establishments in Massachusetts
African-American gangs
Gangs in Massachusetts
Street gangs